Centrocalia is a genus of South Pacific white tailed spiders that was first described by Norman I. Platnick in 2000.  it contains only three species, all found in New Caledonia: C. chazeaui, C. lifoui, and C. ningua.

See also
 List of Lamponidae species

References

Araneomorphae genera
Lamponidae
Spiders of Oceania